Bába is a 2008 Czech short drama film directed by Zuzana Kirchnerová. It won the 1st Prize in the Cinéfondation section at the 2009 Cannes Film Festival.

Cast
 Marika Šoposká as Veronika
 Ondřej Havel as Lukás
 Miluše Šplechtová as Mother

References

External links

2008 films
2008 drama films
2008 short films
2000s Czech-language films
Czech drama films
2000s Czech films